Vexillum is a genus of small to medium-sized sea snails, marine gastropod mollusks in the family Costellariidae.

This genus is not monophyletic. It is considered a "dumping ground" for an array of unrelated forms.

Description
The shell is elongated, turreted, longitudinally ribbed or plicate. The spire is acuminated. The aperture is narrow. The columella shows numerous plaits. The outer lip is internally striated.

Distribution
This genus is cosmopolitan and occurs in tropical and temperate seas.

Species
Species within the genus Vexillum include:

 Vexillum accinctum (G. B. Sowerby III, 1907)
 Vexillum acromiale (Hedley, 1915)
 Vexillum acuminatum (Gmelin, 1791)
 Vexillum acupictum (Reeve, 1845)
 Vexillum adamsi (Dohrn, 1861)
 Vexillum adamsianum Cernohorsky, 1978
 Vexillum adelense Marrow, 2019
 Vexillum adornatum (Tomlin, 1920)
 Vexillum aemula (E. A. Smith, 1879)
 Vexillum aequatoriense Herrmann & Stossier, 2011
 Vexillum aethiopicum (Jickeli, 1874)
 † Vexillum aizyense (Deshayes, 1865) 
 Vexillum albocinctum (C. B. Adams, 1845)
 Vexillum albofulvum Herrmann, 2007
 Vexillum alboglobulatum R. Salisbury & Gori, 2019
 Vexillum albolineatum Cossignani & Cossignani, 2007
 † Vexillum alfuricum (P. J. Fischer, 1927) 
 Vexillum albotaeniatum (Hervier, 1897)
 Vexillum altisuturatum Chino & Herrmann, 2014
 Vexillum alvinobalani Guillot de Suduiraut, 1999
 Vexillum amabile (Reeve, 1845)
 Vexillum amandum (Reeve, 1845)
 Vexillum amentare S.-I. Huang, 2017
 Vexillum angulosum (Küster, 1839)
 Vexillum angustissimum (E.A. Smith, 1903)
 Vexillum anthracinum (Reeve, 1844)
 Vexillum antonellii (Dhorn, 1860)
 Vexillum appelii (Jickeli, 1874)
 Vexillum approximatum (Pease, 1860)
 Vexillum arabicum Turner, 2008
 Vexillum articulatum (Reeve, 1845)
 Vexillum asperum Turner, 2008
 † Vexillum atractoides (Tate, 1889)
 Vexillum aureolatum (Reeve, 1844)
 Vexillum aureolineatum H. Turner, 1988
 Vexillum baccheti R. Salisbury & Herrmann, 2012
 † Vexillum badense (R. Hoernes & Auinger, 1880) 
 Vexillum baeri Poppe, Tagaro & Salisbury, 2009
 Vexillum balicasagense Salisbury & Guillot de Suduiraut, 2006
 Vexillum balteolatum (Reeve, 1844)
 Vexillum bancalanense (Bartsch, 1918)
 Vexillum bangertarum Herrmann, 2019
 † Vexillum barbieri (Deshayes, 1865) 
 Vexillum beitzi R. Salisbury & Gori, 2013
 Vexillum bellum (Pease, 1860)
 Vexillum bergae T. Cossignani, 2020
 Vexillum beverlyae Turner & Salisbury, 1999
 † Vexillum bicatenatum (K. Martin, 1935) 
 Vexillum bipartitum (E. A. Smith, 1884)
 Vexillum bizonale (Dautzenberg & Bouge, 1923)
 Vexillum blandulum Turner, 1997
 † Vexillum boreocinctum (Kautsky, 1925) 
 † Vexillum bouryi (Cossmann, 1889)
 Vexillum bouteti R. Salisbury & Herrmann, 2012
 † Vexillum boutillieri (Cossmann, 1889) 
 † Vexillum brevior (Friedberg, 1911)
 Vexillum brunneolinea Rosenberg & Salisbury, 1991
 Vexillum burchorum R. Salisbury, 2011
 Vexillum buriasense (Tomlin, 1920)
 Vexillum cadaverosum (Reeve, 1844)
 Vexillum caelatum (Reeve, 1845)
 Vexillum caffrum (Linnaeus, 1758)
 Vexillum caliendrum (Melvill & Standen, 1901)
 Vexillum caligulum S.-I Huang & M.-H. Lin, 2020
 Vexillum callosum (Reeve, 1845)
 Vexillum caloxestum (Melvill, 1888)
 Vexillum cancellarioides (Anton, 1838)
 Vexillum castaneostriatum Herrmann, 2012
 Vexillum castum (H. Adams, 1872)
 Vexillum catenatum (Broderip, 1836)
 † Vexillum caudatum (Marwick, 1931) 
 Vexillum cavea (Reeve, 1844)
 † Vexillum cernohorskyi Ladd, 1977 
 Vexillum charlesi Turner & Callomon, 2001
 Vexillum chelonia (Reeve, 1845)
 Vexillum chibaense (Salisbury & Rosenberg, 1999)
 Vexillum chickcharneorum Lyons & Kaicher, 1978
 Vexillum chinoi Poppe, 2008
 Vexillum chocotinctum Turner, 2008
 Vexillum cingulatum (Lamarck, 1811)
 Vexillum cithara (Reeve, 1845)
 Vexillum citrinum (Gmelin, 1791)
 Vexillum clarum S.-I Huang & M.-H. Lin, 2020
 Vexillum clathratum (Reeve, 1844)
 Vexillum coccineum (Reeve, 1844)
 Vexillum collinsoni (A. Adams, 1864)
 Vexillum coloreum S.-I. Huang, 2017
 Vexillum coloscopulus J. M. Cate, 1961
 Vexillum concentricum (Reeve, 1844)
 Vexillum consanguineum (Reeve, 1845)
 Vexillum cookorum Turner, Gori & Salisbury, 2007
 Vexillum corbicula (Sowerby II, 1870)
 Vexillum coronatum (Helbling, 1779)
 Vexillum cosmani (Kay, 1979)
 Vexillum costatum (Gmelin, 1791)
 Vexillum creatum Marrow, 2019
 Vexillum crispum (Garrett, 1872)
 Vexillum crocatum (Lamarck, 1811)
 Vexillum croceorbis Dekkers, 2013
 Vexillum croceostoma Marrow, 2015
 Vexillum croceum (Reeve, 1845)
 Vexillum cubanum Aguayo & Rehder, 1936
 Vexillum curviliratum (Sowerby II & Sowerby III, 1874)
 Vexillum daedalum (Reeve, 1845)
 † Vexillum dahanaensis (Vlerk, 1931) 
 Vexillum dampierense Marrow, 2019
 Vexillum daniellae Drivas & Jay, 1989
 Vexillum darwini Salisbury & Guillot de Suduiraut, 2006
 Vexillum decorum (Reeve, 1845)
 Vexillum delicatum (A. Adams, 1853)
 Vexillum dennisoni (Reeve, 1844)
 Vexillum depexum (Deshayes, 1834)
 Vexillum derkai Herrmann, 2012
 Vexillum dermestinum (Lamarck, 1811)
 Vexillum deshayesi (Reeve, 1845)
 Vexillum dhofarense Gori, Rosado & R. Salisbury, 2019
 Vexillum diaconalis (Melvill & Standen, 1903)
 Vexillum dilectissimum (Melvill & Sykes, 1899)
 Vexillum discolorium (Reeve, 1845)
 Vexillum diutenerum (Hervier, 1897)
 Vexillum dohrni (A. Adams, 1864)
 Vexillum dorleti  T. Cossignani & V. Cossignani, 2021
 Vexillum echinatum (A. Adams, 1853)
 †  Vexillum elatior (Finlay, 1924) 
 Vexillum emiliae (Schmeltz, 1874)
 Vexillum emmanueli Buijse, Dekker & Verbinnen, 2009
 Vexillum epigonus Salisbury & Guillot de Suduiraut, 2006
 Vexillum epiphaneum (Rehder, 1943)
 † Vexillum escharoides (Tate, 1889) 
 † Vexillum etremoides (Finlay, 1924) 
 † Vexillum eusulcatum (Finlay, 1924) 
 Vexillum exaratum (A. Adams, 1853)
 Vexillum exasperatum (Gmelin, 1791)
 Vexillum exostium Marrow, 2019
 Vexillum exquisitum (Garrett, 1873)
 † Vexillum extraneum (Deshayes, 1865) 
 Vexillum festum (Reeve, 1845)
 Vexillum ficulinum (Lamarck, 1811)
 Vexillum fidicula (Gould, 1850)
 Vexillum filistriatum (Sowerby II & Sowerby III, 1874)
 Vexillum flaveoricum Herrmann & Guillot de Suduiraut, 2009
 Vexillum flexicostatum (Garrett, 1880)
 Vexillum formosense (Sowerby III, 1889)
 Vexillum fortiplicatum (Pease, 1868)
 Vexillum fraudator Turner, Gori & Salisbury, 2007
 Vexillum funereum (Reeve, 1844)
 Vexillum fuscoapicatum (E. A. Smith, 1879)
 Vexillum fuscobandatum Bozzetti, 2007
 Vexillum fuscotaeniatum (Thiele, 1925)
 Vexillum fuscovirgatum Herrmann & R. Salisbury, 2012
 Vexillum gagei R. Salisbury, 2011
 Vexillum garciai Salisbury & Wolff, 2009
 † Vexillum gaudryi (de Raincourt, 1884) 
 Vexillum germaineae Herrmann & R. Salisbury, 2014
 Vexillum geronimae Poppe, Tagaro & Salisbury, 2009
 Vexillum giselae Poppe, Tagaro & Salisbury, 2009
 Vexillum gloriae Poppe, Tagaro & Salisbury, 2009
 Vexillum gorii Turner, 1997
 Vexillum gotoense (E. A. Smith, 1879)
 Vexillum goubini (Hervier, 1897)
 Vexillum gouldi Salisbury & Guillot de Suduiraut, 2006
 Vexillum gourgueti R. Salisbury & Herrmann, 2012
 Vexillum granosum (Gmelin, 1791)
 Vexillum gruneri (Reeve, 1844)
 Vexillum guidopoppei Thach, 2017
 Vexillum hansturneri Gori, Rosado & R. Salisbury, 2019
 † Vexillum harmati Csepreghy-Meznerics, 1954
 Vexillum hawksbillense Marrow, 2019
 Vexillum helena (Bartsch, 1915)
 † Vexillum hemigymnum (Cossmann & Pissarro, 1901) 
 Vexillum hendersoni (Dall, 1927)
 Vexillum herosae Herrmann & Salisbury, 2012
 Vexillum hervieri (Dautzenberg & Bouge, 1923)
 Vexillum hilare (Kuroda, 1971)
 Vexillum histrio (Reeve, 1844)
 Vexillum hoaraui Guillot de Suduiraut, 2007
 Vexillum honestum (Melvill & Standen, 1895)
 Vexillum houarti Thach, 2016
 Vexillum huangorum Salisbury & Gori, 2012
 Vexillum humile (Hervier, 1897)
 Vexillum hypatiae (Pallary, 1913)
 † Vexillum indistinctum (K. Martin, 1935) 
 Vexillum inerme (Reeve, 1845)
 Vexillum infaustum (Reeve, 1845)
 Vexillum innocens (Thiele, 1925)
 Vexillum innotabile (E. A. Smith, 1890)
 Vexillum intermedium (Kiener, 1838)
 † Vexillum intermittens (R. Hoernes & Auinger, 1880) 
 Vexillum interruptum (Anton, 1838)
 Vexillum interstriatum (Sowerby II, 1870)
 Vexillum intertaeniatum (Sowerby II, 1874)
 Vexillum iredalei (Powell, 1958)
 Vexillum ismene Turner, 2008
 Vexillum iuppiterale S.-I. Huang, 2017
 Vexillum jacksoni R. Salisbury, 2011
 Vexillum jackylenae Salisbury & Guillot de Suduiraut, 2006
 Vexillum janae T. Cossignani & Lorenz, 2020
 Vexillum japonicum A. Adams, 1864
 Vexillum jasoni R. Salisbury, 2011
 Vexillum jeanetteae R. Salisbury, 2019
 Vexillum jeciliae Poppe, Tagaro & Salisbury, 2009
 Vexillum johnsoni R. Salisbury, 2019
 Vexillum johnwattsi Dekkers, 2011
 Vexillum jonae S.-I. Huang, 2017
 Vexillum jukesii (A. Adams, 1853)
 Vexillum kathiewayae R. Salisbury, Herrmann & Dekkers, 2012
 Vexillum kawamotoae R. Salisbury, 2011
 Vexillum kimiyum Turner, 2008
 Vexillum klytios Turner, 2008
 Vexillum kraussi (Dunker, 1861)
 Vexillum kuboi Turner, Gori & Salisbury, 2007
 Vexillum kuiperi Turner, 2006
 Vexillum lanulentum S.-I. Huang, 2017
 Vexillum leforti Turner & Salisbury, 1999
 Vexillum lenhilli Kay, 1979
 Vexillum leucaspis Herrmann & Stossier, 2011
 Vexillum leucodesma (Reeve, 1845)
 Vexillum leucophryna Turner & Marrow, 2001
 Vexillum leucozonias (Deshayes in Laborde, 1834)
 Vexillum leyteensis Poppe, Tagaro & Salisbury, 2009
 Vexillum ligatum (A. Adams, 1853)
 Vexillum lincolnensis (Angas, 1878)
 Vexillum longispira (G. B. Sowerby II, 1874)
 Vexillum lotum (Reeve, 1845)
 Vexillum lucens S.-I Huang & M.-H. Lin, 2020
 Vexillum lucidum (Reeve, 1845)
 Vexillum luculentum (Reeve, 1845)
 Vexillum luigiraybaudii Poppe, Guillot de Suduiraut & Tagaro, 2006
 Vexillum lumilum S.-I Huang & M.-H. Lin, 2020
 Vexillum lyratum (Lamarck, 1822)
 Vexillum macandrewi (Sowerby II & Sowerby II, 1874)
 Vexillum macrospira (A. Adams, 1853)
 Vexillum maduranum Dekkers, 2007
 Vexillum malcolmense (Melvill & Standen, 1901)
 Vexillum malleopunctum (Cernohorsky, 1981)
 Vexillum marotiriense Herrmann & R. Salisbury, 2012
  † Vexillum martini Schepman, 1907
 Vexillum maxencei Cossignani, 2018
 Vexillum mccauslandi Salisbury & Wolff, 2005
 Vexillum mediomaculatum (Sowerby II, 1870)
 Vexillum melongena (Lamarck, 1811)
 Vexillum menehune R. Salisbury, 2011
 Vexillum meslivres S.-I Huang, 2023
 Vexillum mica (Reeve, 1845)
 Vexillum michaelianum R. Salisbury, 2011
 Vexillum michaui (Crosse & Fischer, 1864)
 † Vexillum michelottii (M. Hörnes, 1852) 
 Vexillum micra (Pilsbry, 1921)
 Vexillum militare (Reeve, 1845)
 Vexillum millecostatum (Broderip, 1836)
 † Vexillum minahassae (Schepman, 1907) 
 Vexillum minghuii S.-I. Huang, 2017
 Vexillum mirabile (A. Adams, 1853)
 Vexillum mirbatense Gori, Rosado & R. Salisbury, 2019
 Vexillum modestum (Reeve, 1845)
 Vexillum moelleri (Küster, 1840)
 Vexillum monalizae Poppe, Guillot de Suduiraut & Tagaro, 2006
 Vexillum moniliferum (C. B. Adams, 1850)
 Vexillum monscorallum Hoffman & Freiwald, 2019
 Vexillum monsecourorum Poppe, Guillot de Suduiraut & Tagaro, 2006
 Vexillum multicostatum (Broderip, 1836)
 Vexillum multitriangulum Salisbury & Callomon, 1998
 Vexillum mutabile (Reeve, 1845)
 Vexillum nakama (Dall, 1926)
 Vexillum nasinii T. Cossignani & V. Cossignani, 2021
 † Vexillum nasongoense (Ladd, 1934) 
 Vexillum nathani T. Cossignani, 2021
 † Vexillum neozelanicum (Laws, 1939) 
 † Vexillum neudorfense (Schaffer, 1897) 
 Vexillum nicobaricum (Dunker, 1866)
 Vexillum nitidissimum (Melvill & Standen, 1895)
 † Vexillum nitidum (Schaffer, 1897)
 Vexillum nivale Herrmann & Guillot de Suduiraut, 2009
 Vexillum nodai Turner & Salisbury, 1999
 Vexillum noduliferum (A. Adams, 1853)
 Vexillum obeliscus (Reeve, 1844)
 Vexillum obtusispinosum (G. B. Sowerby II, 1874)
 Vexillum ochraceum (Hervier, 1897)
 Vexillum oleaceum (Reeve, 1844)
 Vexillum oniscinum (Lamarck, 1811)
 Vexillum oryzum Kay, 1979
 Vexillum oteroi R. Salisbury & Gori, 2013
 Vexillum pacificum (Reeve, 1845)
 Vexillum pagodula (Hervier, 1897)
 Vexillum palauense R. Salisbury & Gori, 2019
 Vexillum paligerum (Sowerby II & Sowerby III, 1874)
 Vexillum pantherinum Herrmann & R. Salisbury, 2012
 Vexillum pardale (Küster, 1840)
 Vexillum pasitheum (Melvill & Standen, 1901)
 Vexillum patulum (Reeve, 1845)
 Vexillum pedroi Poppe & Tagaro, 2006
 Vexillum pelaezi Poppe, Tagaro & Salisbury, 2009
 Vexillum pellucidum (Tate, 1887)
 Vexillum percnodictya (Melvill, 1888)
 Vexillum perrieri (Dautzenberg, 1929)
 Vexillum philtwoi Poppe, Tagaro & Salisbury, 2009
 Vexillum picardali Herrmann & Stossier, 2011
 Vexillum piceum (Pease, 1860)
 Vexillum pilsbryi (Hedley, 1899)
 Vexillum pisolinum (Lamarck, 1811)
 Vexillum plicarium (Linnaeus, 1758)
 Vexillum plurinotatum (Hervier, 1897)
 Vexillum polygonum (Gmelin, 1791)
 Vexillum poppei Guillot de Suduiraut, 2007
 Vexillum potieri Drivas & Jay, 1989
 Vexillum praefulguratum Poppe, 2008
 Vexillum pristisinuosum Marrow, 2019
 Vexillum pseudomonalizae Gori, Rosado & R. Salisbury, 2019
 † Vexillum pseudoschafferi Biskupič, 2020 
 Vexillum puerile (Cooke, 1885)
 Vexillum pulchellum (Reeve, 1844)
 Vexillum purpuratum (Reeve, 1845)
 Vexillum pyropus Turner & Marrow, 2001
 Vexillum radius (Reeve, 1845)
 Vexillum radix (Sowerby II & Sowerby III, 1874)
 † Vexillum rajaensis (K. Martin, 1895) 
 † Vexillum recticosta (Bellardi, 1850) 
 Vexillum recurvirostris (Sowerby III, 1908)
 Vexillum regina (Sowerby I, 1828)
 Vexillum renatoi Poppe, Tagaro & Salisbury, 2009
 Vexillum revelatum (Melvill, 1899)
 Vexillum rodgersi Salisbury & Wolff, 2005
 Vexillum rolani Gori, Rosado & R. Salisbury, 2019
 Vexillum ronnyi Poppe, Tagaro & Salisbury, 2009
 Vexillum roris S.-I Huang & M.-H. Lin, 2020
 Vexillum roseotinctum (Hervier, 1897)
 Vexillum roseum (Broderip, 1836)
 Vexillum rubellum (Adams & Reeve, 1850)
 Vexillum rubricatum (Reeve, 1845)
 Vexillum rubrocostatum Habe & Kosuge, 1966
 Vexillum rugosum (Gmelin, 1791)
 Vexillum rusticum (Reeve, 1845)
 Vexillum salisburyi Cernohorsky, 1976
 Vexillum salmoneum (G. B. Sowerby II, 1874)
 Vexillum sanctahelenae (E. A. Smith, 1890)
 Vexillum sanguisuga (Linnaeus, 1758)
 † Vexillum schafferi (Meznerics, 1933)
 Vexillum scitulum (A. Adams, 1853)
 Vexillum sculptile (Reeve, 1845)
 Vexillum severnsi R. Salisbury, 2011
 Vexillum sinuosum Turner, 2008
 Vexillum sneidari R. Salisbury, 2011
 Vexillum spiculum Bozzetti, 2013
 Vexillum stephanuchum (Melvill, 1897)
 Vexillum stercopunctis Turner, 2008
 Vexillum strnadi Poppe & Tagaro, 2010
 Vexillum styria (Dall, 1889)
 † Vexillum svagrovskyi Biskupič, 2020 
 Vexillum sykesi (Melvill, 1925)
 Vexillum semicostatum (Anton, 1838)
 Vexillum semifasciatum (Lamarck, 1811)
 Vexillum semisculptum (Adams & Reeve, 1850)
 Vexillum semiticum (Jickeli, 1874)
 Vexillum seroi T. Cossignani, 2022
 Vexillum severnsi R. Salisbury, 2011
 Vexillum sharkbayense Marrow, 2019
 Vexillum siciliai R. Salisbury & Gori, 2019
 Vexillum sigristi Gori, Rosado & R. Salisbury, 2019
 Vexillum silviae Turner, Gori & Salisbury, 2007
 Vexillum sinuosum H. Turner, 2008
 Vexillum sitangkaianum J. M. Cate, 1968
 Vexillum smithi (Sowerby III, 1889)
 Vexillum sneidari R. Salisbury, 2011
 Vexillum speciosum (Reeve, 1844)
 Vexillum spicatum (Reeve, 1845)
 Vexillum spiculum Bozzetti, 2013
 Vexillum stainforthii (Reeve, 1842)
 Vexillum stephanuchum (Melvill, 1897)
 Vexillum stercopunctis H. Turner, 2008
 Vexillum stossieri Turner & Marrow, 2001
 † Vexillum strasfogeli Ladd, 1977 
 Vexillum strictecostatum (von Maltzan, 1884)
 Vexillum strnadi Poppe & Tagaro, 2010
 Vexillum styria (Dall, 1889)
 Vexillum subdivisum (Gmelin, 1791)
 Vexillum subquadratum (Sowerby II & Sowerby III, 1874)
 Vexillum subtruncatum (G. B. Sowerby II, 1874)
 Vexillum suluense (Adams & Reeve, 1850)
 Vexillum sumatranum (Thiele, 1925)
 Vexillum superbiens (Melvill, 1895)
  † Vexillum svagrovskyi Biskupič, 2020
 Vexillum sybillae (Melvill, 1888)
 Vexillum sykesi (Melvill, 1925)
 Vexillum taeniatum (Lamarck, 1811)
 Vexillum takakuwai Cernohorsky & Azuma, 1974
 Vexillum tanguyae Guillot de Suduiraut & Boutet, 2007
 Vexillum tankervillei (Melvill, 1888)
 Vexillum taylorianum (Sowerby II & Sowerby III, 1874)
 † Vexillum terebelloides (d'Orbigny, 1850) 
 † Vexillum terebellum (Lamarck, 1803) 
 Vexillum tenebricosum Gori, Rosado & R. Salisbury, 2019
 Vexillum terraqueum S.-I. Huang, 2017
 Vexillum thila Turner, Gori & Salisbury, 2007
 Vexillum thorssoni Poppe, Guillot de Suduiraut & Tagaro, 2006
 Vexillum tiro S.-I Huang, 2023
 Vexillum togianense Herrmann & Kurtz, 2013
 Vexillum tokubeii (Sakura & Habe, 1964)
 Vexillum torotortum Turner, Gori & Salisbury, 2007
 Vexillum torquatum Herrmann, 2012
 Vexillum torricella Turner, 2008
 Vexillum trilineatum Herrmann & Stossier, 2011
 Vexillum troendlei Herrmann & R. Salisbury, 2012
 Vexillum trophonium (Dall, 1889)
 Vexillum tulearense T. Cossignani, 2021
 Vexillum tumidum (Reeve, 1844)
 Vexillum turben (Reeve, 1844)
 Vexillum turriger (Reeve, 1845)
 Vexillum tusum (Reeve, 1845)
 Vexillum unicolor Herrmann, 2012
 Vexillum unifasciale (Lamarck, 1811)
 Vexillum unifasciatum (Wood, 1828)
 Vexillum vandervlerki (Koperberg, 1931)
 Vexillum vangemerti Dekkers, 2014
 Vexillum variatum (Reeve, 1845)
 Vexillum varicosum Turner, 2008
 Vexillum venustulum (Reeve, 1844)
 Vexillum verecundulum (Hervier, 1897)
 Vexillum vespula Turner & Marrow, 2001
 Vexillum vezzarochristophei Cossignani, 2018
 Vexillum vezzaroi T. Cossignani, 2021
 Vexillum vezzaronellyae T. Cossignani, 2021
 Vexillum vibex (A. Adams, 1853)
 Vexillum virginale (Lesson, 1842)
 Vexillum virgo (Linne, 1767)
 Vexillum volae Perugia, 2010
 Vexillum voncoseli (Poppe, Tagaro & R. Salisbury, 2009)
 Vexillum vulpecula (Linne, 1758)
 Vexillum wandoense (Holmes, 1859)
 Vexillum woldemarii (Kiener, 1838)
 Vexillum wolfei Cernohorsky, 1978
 Vexillum xenium Pilsbry, 1921
 Vexillum yangi S.-I. Huang, 2017
 Vexillum yulini S.-I. Huang, 2017
 Vexillum yvesfineti T. Cossignani & V. Cossignani, 2021
 Vexillum zebuense (Reeve, 1844)
 Vexillum zelotypum (Reeve, 1845)
 Vexillum ziervogelii (Gmelin, 1791)

Taxa inquirenda
 Vexillum lanceolatum (Hervier, 1897) (possible synonym of V. costatum)
 Vexillum thaanumi Pilsbry, 1921
 Vexillum tomlini (Melvill, 1925)

Synonyms
 Vexillum albatum Cernohorsky, 1988: synonym of Vexillum castum (H. Adams, 1872)
 Vexillum apicinctum (Verco, 1896): synonym of Turriplicifer apicitinctus (Verco, 1896)
 Vexillum arestum (Rehder, 1943): synonym of Vexillum articulatum (Reeve, 1845)
 Vexillum australe (Swainson, 1820): synonym of Turriplicifer australis (Swainson, 1820)
 Vexillum balutense Herrmann, 2009: synonym of Pusia balutensis (Herrmann, 2009) (basionym)
 Vexillum bilineatum (Reeve, 1845): synonym of Protoelongata bilineata (Reeve, 1845)
 Vexillum blanfordi (Melvill & Standen, 1901): synonym of Volutomitra blanfordi (Melvill & Standen, 1901)
 Vexillum choslenae Cernohorsky, 1982: synonym of Pusia choslenae (Cernohorsky, 1982)
 Vexillum cinerium [sic]: synonym of Vexillum leucozonias (Deshayes, 1833)
 Vexillum crassum (Simone, 1995): synonym of Nodicostellaria crassa (Simone, 1995)
 Vexillum corallinum (Reeve, 1845): synonym of Protoelongata corallina (Reeve, 1845)
 † Vexillum cupressinum (Brocchi 1814): synonym of † Tosapusia cupressina (Brocchi, 1814)
 Vexillum dautzenbergi Poppe, Guillot de Suduiraut & Tagaro, 2006: synonym of Pusia dautzenbergi (Poppe, E. Guillot de Suduiraut & Tagaro, 2006)
 Vexillum duplex Cernohorsky, 1982: synonym of Tosapusia duplex (Cernohorsky, 1982)
 Vexillum ebenus (Lamarck, 1811): synonym of Pusia ebenus (Lamarck, 1811)
 Vexillum elliscrossi Rosenberg & Salisbury, 1991: synonym of Pusia elliscrossi (Rosenberg & R. Salisbury, 1991)
 Vexillum evelynae Guillot de Suduiraut, 2007: synonym of Tosapusia evelyniana (S.-I. Huang, 2017)
 Vexillum exiguum (C. B. Adams, 1845): synonym of Atlantilux exigua (C. B. Adams, 1845)
 Vexillum filiareginae (J. Cate, 1961): synonym of Vexillum coloscopulus J. M. Cate, 1961
 Vexillum fulvosulcatum (Melvill, 1888): synonym of Vexillum infaustum (Reeve, 1845)
 † Vexillum fusellinum (Lamarck, 1803): synonym of † Conomitra fusellina (Lamarck, 1803)
 Vexillum gemmatum (Sowerby II, 1874): synonym of Atlantilux gemmata (G. B. Sowerby II, 1874)
 Vexillum granum (Forbes, 1844): synonym of Pusia granum (Forbes, 1844)
 Vexillum hansenae Cernohorsky, 1973: synonym of Pusia hansenae (Cernohorsky, 1973)
 Vexillum isaoi (Kuroda & Sakurai, 1959): synonym of Tosapusia isaoi (Kuroda & Sakurai, 1959)
 Vexillum joliveti Poppe & Tagaro, 2006: synonym of Costapex joliveti (Poppe & Tagaro, 2006) (basionym)
 Vexillum kaicherae (Petuch, 1979): synonym of Nodicostellaria kaicherae (Petuch, 1979)
 Vexillum kremerae (Petuch, 1987): synonym of Nodicostellaria kremerae Petuch, 1987
 Vexillum kurodai (Sakurai & Habe, 1964): synonym of Tosapusia isaoi (Kuroda & Sakurai, 1959)
 Vexillum lautum (Reeve, 1845): synonym of Pusia lauta (Reeve, 1845)
 Vexillum leonardhilli (Petuch, 1987): synonym of Turricostellaria leonardhilli Petuch, 1987
 Vexillum laterculatum (Sowerby II & Sowerby III, 1874): synonym of Nodicostellaria laterculata (G. B. Sowerby II, 1874)
 Vexillum lindae (Petuch, 1987): synonym of Turricostellaria lindae Petuch, 1987
 Vexillum loyaltyense (Hervier, 1897): synonym of Protoelongata loyaltyensis (Hervier, 1897)
 Vexillum lubens (Reeve, 1845): synonym of Vexillum modestum (Reeve, 1845)
 Vexillum martinorum Cernohorsky, 1986: synonym of Costapex martinorum (Cernohorsky, 1986)
 Vexillum marrowi Cernohorsky, 1973: synonym of Thaluta maxmarrowi (Cernohorsky, 1980)
 Vexillum microzonias (Lamarck, 1811): synonym of Pusia microzonias (Lamarck, 1811)
 Vexillum nodospiculum (Cernohorsky, 1970): synonym of Atlantilux nodospicula (Cernohorsky, 1970)
 Vexillum osiridis (Issel, 1869): synonym of Orphanopusia osiridis (Issel, 1869)
 Vexillum pailoloanum J. M. Cate, 1963 : synonym of Volutomitra pailoloana (J. M. Cate, 1963)
 Vexillum patriarchale (Gmelin, 1791): synonym of Orphanopusia patriarchalis (Gmelin, 1791)
 Vexillum pratasense T.C. Lan, 2004: synonym of Tosapusia duplex (Cernohorsky, 1982)
 Vexillum puella (Reeve, 1845): synonym of Atlantilux puella (Reeve, 1845)
 Vexillum puncturatum (Sowerby III, 1879): synonym of Vexillum zebuense (Reeve, 1844)
 Vexillum rubrum (Broderip, 1836): synonym of Atlantilux rubra (Broderip, 1836)
 Vexillum sagamiense (Kuroda & Habe, 1971): synonym of Vexillum castum (H. Adams, 1872)
 Vexillum sauternesense Guillot de Suduiraut, 1997: synonym of Tosapusia sauternesensis (E. Guillot de Suduiraut, 1997)
 Vexillum savignyi (Payraudeau, 1826): synonym of Pusia savignyi (Payraudeau, 1826)
 Vexillum suave (Sowerby, 1875): synonym of Vexillum exquisitum (Garrett, 1873)
 Vexillum tricolor (Gmelin, 1791): synonym of Pusia tricolor (Gmelin, 1791)
 Vexillum venustum (Sarasúa, 1978): synonym of Vexillum pulchellum (Reeve, 1844)
 Vexillum vicmanoui Turner & Marrow, 2001: synonym of Pusia vicmanoui (H. Turner & Marrow, 2001)
 Vexillum zebrinum (d'Orbigny in Webb & Berthelot, 1839): synonym of Pusia zebrina (d'Orbigny, 1840)

References

 Swainson, W. (1840). A treatise on malacology or shells and shell-fish. London, Longman. viii
 Turner H. (2001) Katalog der Familie Costellariidae Macdonald 1860 (Gastropoda: Prosobranchia: Muricoidea). Hackenheim: Conchbooks. 100 pp.

External links
 Röding, P. F. (1798). Museum Boltenianum sive Catalogus cimeliorum e tribus regnis naturæ quæ olim collegerat Joa. Fried Bolten, M. D. p. d. per XL. annos proto physicus Hamburgensis. Pars secunda continens Conchylia sive Testacea univalvia, bivalvia & multivalvia. Trapp, Hamburg. viii, 199 pp
 Swainson, W. (1840). A treatise on malacology or shells and shell-fish. London, Longman. viii + 419 pp.
 Blainville, H. M. D. de. (1824). Mollusques, Mollusca (Malacoz.), pp. 1-392. In: Dictionnaire des Sciences Naturelles (F. Cuvier, ed.), vol. 32. Levrault, Strasbourg et Paris, & Le Normant, Paris
 Iredale, T. (1929). Queensland molluscan notes, No. 1. Memoirs of the Queensland Museum. 9(3): 261-297, pls 30-31
 Bellardi, L. (1887). I molluschi dei terreni terziarii del Piemonte e della Liguria. Parte V. Mitridae (continuazione). Ermanno Loescher, Torino, 72 pp., 2 pl.,
Swainson, W. (1829-1833). Zoological Illustrations, or original figures and descriptions of new, rare, or interesting animals, selected chiefly from the classes of ornithology, entomology, and conchology, and arranged according to their apparent affinities. Second series. London: Baldwin & Cradock.
 Fedosov A.E., Puillandre N., Herrmann M., Dgebuadze P. & Bouchet P. (2017). Phylogeny, systematics, and evolution of the family Costellariidae (Gastropoda: Neogastropoda). Zoological Journal of the Linnean Society. 179(3): 541-626

 
Gastropod genera